A zone d'exploitation contrôlée (in French; acronym ZEC) is a "Controlled harvesting zone" located in public lands areas of Quebec, in Canada. ZECs are a system of territorial infrastructures set up in 1978 by the Government of Quebec to take over from private hunting, fishing and trapping clubs (as a result of "Operation wildlife management") to provide timely access to recreational activities to the general public like hunting and fishing.

Administration

They are non profit organisations managed by honorary administrators whose primary responsibility is to manage fishing and hunting activities and see to wildlife conservation on their respective territories.

ZEC objectives:
 Wildlife conservation (hunters and anglers must report their catch)
 Access to wildlife resources
 User participation
 Operations must be financially self-sufficient

ZECs fill a much larger economic place than fishing and hunting clubs did as they also promote all types of recreational and tourism activities such as hiking, canoeing, canoe-camping, mountain-biking, rock-climbing, vacationing and cottage rental, camping, wildlife/nature observation, wild berry picking, etc. They are open to all recreational enthusiasts and reservations are generally not required.

Organisation 
The 86 ZECs consist of 63 hunting and fishing areas, 22 salmon fishing areas, and one wildfowl hunting area. They are gathered in 11 regional groups whose role is to facilitate exchanges between managers from different ZECs and allow solving common problems.

Four years after the first ZEC inaugurations, the Government of Quebec helped the ZEC administrators to found the Fédération québécoise des gestionnaires de zecs (FQGZ) whose role is to provide a common voice to all the ZECs at the provincial level and promote wildlife conservation.

List across the Province

References 

 
Tourism in Quebec
Protected areas of Quebec
Organizations based in Quebec
Economy of Quebec
Geography of Quebec